This article describes automobile transmission. For heavy-duty 5 speed automatic transmission, see ZF Ecomat.

5HP is ZF Friedrichshafen AG's trademark name for its five-speed automatic transmission models (5-speed transmission with Hydraulic converter and Planetary gearsets) for longitudinal engine applications, designed and built by ZF's subsidiary in Saarbrücken.

Specifications

Final Conventionally Designed Gearbox

The 5HP is the last transmission family that utilized a conventional design. To meet the requirements for a greater number of gear ratios, the only viable option entailed adding more components. That made these gearboxes bigger, heavier and even more expensive to build.  As the presence of up to ten main components (two Ravigneaux gearsets in series, along with brakes and clutches) showed, this marked the end of conventional gearbox design.  The successor, the 6HP-family, employed an all-new Lepelletier gear mechanism design, which needed only eight main components in order to achieve six gear ratios.  This demonstrated a new paradigm in gearbox design.

Technical data

Ravigneaux Planetary Gearset Types

5HP 18

Introduced in 1991 on the BMW E36 320i/325i and E34 5 Series.
Input torque maximum is 
Weight: ~75 kilograms (165 lb)
Oil capacity: ~10.5 litres (11.1 quarts)

Applications
1992-1993 BMW E32 — 730i M60B30
1992-1995 BMW E34 — 525i M50B25TÜ
1992-1995 BMW E34 — 530i M60B30
1992-1995 BMW E34 — 525tds M51D25
1995-2000 BMW E38 — 725tds M51D25
1994-1996 BMW E38 — 730I M60B30
1993-1996 BMW E36 — M3 S50B30US
1995-1999 BMW E36 — 328i M52B28 - BMW Part No A5S 310Z
1996-1998 BMW E38 — 728i/iL M52B28 
1997-1999 BMW E36 — M3 3.2 S52B32
1995-1999 BMW E39 — 523i M52B25
1995-1999 BMW E39 — 528i M52B28
1995-1999 BMW E39 — 525tds M51D25
1991-1999 BMW E36 — 320i

5HP 19

Introduced in 1996, it has been used in a variety of cars from Audi, BMW, Porsche, and Volkswagen Passenger Cars.
Input torque maximum is 
Weight: ~79 kilograms (174 lb)
Oil capacity: ~9.2 litres (9.8 quarts)

Applications

BMW — longitudinal engine, rear wheel drive
2001–2003 BMW E46 — 330Ci M54B30
2001–2003 BMW E46 — 330i M54B30
2000–2003 BMW E46 — 320i M52TUB20/ M54B22
2000– BMW E46 — 323Ci M52TUB25
2000– BMW E46 — 323i M52TUB25
2000– BMW E46 — 328i M52TUB28
2000– BMW E38 — 728i M52TUB28
2001–2003 BMW E46 — 325Ci M54B25
2001–2003 BMW E46 — 325i M54B25
1999–2002 BMW E39 — 520i M52TUB20
1999–2002 BMW E39 — 523i M52TUB25
1999–2002 BMW E39 — 528i M52TUB28
2001–2003 BMW E39 — 525i M54B25
2001–2003 BMW E39 — 530i M54B30
2002–2005 BMW E85 — Z4 (M54 engine)

5HP 19FL
Applications

Volkswagen Group — longitudinal engine transaxle, front-wheel drive
1996–2001 Audi A4 (B5) 2.8 V6
1997–2003 Audi A4 (B5) 1.8T
1997–1999 Audi A8 (D2) 3.7 V8
1998–2001 Audi A6 (C5) 2.8 V6
1998–2003 Volkswagen Passat GLS 1.8T
1998–2003 Volkswagen Passat GLS 2.8 V6
1998–2003 Volkswagen Passat GLX 2.8 V6
2003– Volkswagen Passat GL 1.8T
2004–2005 Volkswagen Passat GLS 2.0 TDI [ZF 1060 030106, VW GMR], [A73 Torque Converter]

5HP 19FLA
Applications

Volkswagen Group — longitudinal engine, transaxle permanent four-wheel drive
1996–2001 Audi A4 (B5) 2.8 V6 quattro
1997–2001 Audi S4 (B5) 2.7 V6 'biturbo' quattro
1997–2005 Audi A4 (B5) and Audi A4 (B6) 1.8 T quattro
1998–2001 Audi A6 (C5) 2.8 V6 quattro
2000–2003 Audi A6 2.7 V6 biturbo quattro
2000–2003 Volkswagen Passat GLS V6 4motion 2.8 V6
2000–2003 Volkswagen Passat GLX V6 4motion 2.8 V6
2004–2005 Volkswagen Passat GLS    4motion 1.8T
2001–2003 Audi allroad quattro 2.7 V6 biturbo
2002–2005 Audi A4 (B6) 3.0 V6 quattro
2002–2003 Audi A6 (C5) 3.0 V6 quattro
2002–2003 Volkswagen Passat 4.0 W8 4motion

1999 (DRN/EKX) transmissions used Induction speed sensors and 2000+ (FAS) transmissions used Hall Effect sensors.  These transmissions are mechanically the same, but are not interchangeable.

5HP 19HL 
Applications

Porsche — longitudinal engine rear engine transaxle
1998–2003 Porsche 911 Carrera 996 3.4
2002–2003 Porsche 911 Targa 996 3.6

5HP 19HLA 
Applications

Porsche — longitudinal engine rear engine transaxle
1999–2003 Porsche 911 Carrera 996 3.6
1999–2003 Porsche 911 Carrera 4S 996 3.6

Porsche — mid-engine design flat-six engine, 5-speed tiptronic #1060, rear-wheel drive A87.01-xxx, A87.02-xxx, A87.21-xxx, [5HP19FL Valve Body, Solenoids, and Speed Sensor. Different Wiring Harness.] [Speed Sensor/Pulser part # ZF 0501314432]
2005–2008 Porsche Boxster 987 2.7 6-cyl
2005–2008 Porsche Boxster S 987 3.4 6-cyl
2005–2008 Porsche Cayman 987 2.7 6-cyl
2005–2008 Porsche Cayman S 987 3.4 6-cyl

Simpson Planetary Gearset Types

5HP 24

Introduced in 1996, it has been used in a variety of cars from Audi, BMW, Jaguar, and Land Rover – all with a front mounted longitudinal engine.
Input torque maximum is 
Weight: ~
Oil capacity: ~

Applications
1996–1997 BMW E31 — 840Ci M62/B44
1997–2001 BMW E38 — 735i M62/B35
1997–2001 BMW E38 — 735iL M62/B35
1997–2001 BMW E38 — 740i M62/B44
1997–2001 BMW E38 — 740iL M62/B44
1998–2001 BMW E38 — 730d  M57
1997–2003 BMW E39 — 540i M62/B44
2000–2003 BMW E39 — Alpina D10 Bi-turbo
1997-2003 Jaguar XJ Sport 3.2 V8
1997–2002 Jaguar XK8 V8 4.0L
1998–2003 BMW E53 — X5 4.4i
1998–2002 Jaguar XJ8 4.0 V8
1998–2001 Jaguar XJ8 Vanden Plas 4.0 V8
1998–2001 Jaguar XJ8 L 4.0 V8
2001–2003 BMW E53 — 4.6is V8
2002–2003 BMW Z8 — Alpina 4.8 V8
2002–2003 Jaguar XJ Sport 4.0 V8
2003–2005 Range Rover (L322) — With BMW M62/B44 engine

5HP 24A 

Four-wheel drive version used in Audi (quattro) and Volkswagen Passenger Cars (4motion) marques of the Volkswagen Group:
Input torque maximum is 
Weight: ~
Oil capacity: ~

Applications
1997–2003 Audi A8 (D2) 4.2 V8
2001–2002 Audi A8 (D2) 6.0 W12
1998–2003 Audi S8 (D2) 4.2 V8
1999–2004 Audi A6 (C5) 4.2 V8
1999–2004 Audi S6 (C5) 4.2 V8
2000–2003 Audi A8L (D2) 4.2 V8
2002–2004 Audi RS6 (C5) 4.2 biturbo V8
2002–2011 Volkswagen Phaeton (Typ 3D)

5HP 30

Introduced in 1992, it was produced through 2003, and has been used in a variety of cars from Aston Martin, Bentley, BMW, and Rolls-Royce.
Input torque maximum is 
Weight: ~109 kilograms (240 lb)
Oil capacity: ~13.5 litres (14.3 quarts)

Applications
1992–1995 BMW E34 — 540i M60/B40
1995–1997 BMW E39 — 540i M62/B44
1998–2001 BMW E39 — 540i M62/B44TU
1992–1994 BMW E32 — 740i M60/B40
1994–1995 BMW E38 — 740i M60/B40
1996–1997 BMW E38 — 740i M62/B44
1992–1994 BMW E32 — 740iL M60/B40
1994–1995 BMW E38 — 740iL M60/B40
1996–1997 BMW E38 — 740iL M62/B44
1998-2001 BMW E38 — 740d M67/D40
1994–2001 BMW E38 — 750iL M73/B54
1993–1995 BMW E31 — 840i M60/B40
1995–1996 BMW E31 — 840Ci M62/B44
1994–1997 BMW E31 — 850Ci M73/B54
1998–2003 Rolls-Royce Silver Seraph 5.4 V12
1998–2000 Bentley Arnage 4.4 V8
1999–2003 Aston Martin DB7 Vantage 6.0 V12
1999–2003 Aston Martin DB7 Vantage Volante 6.0 V12

See also 
 List of ZF transmissions

Notes

References 

 

5HP